Sheephouse Wood is a  biological Site of Special Scientific Interest east of Charndon in Buckinghamshire.

The site has ancient pedunculate oak woodland with diverse ground flora, typical breeding birds and some uncommon invertebrates. It is located on very poorly drained Oxford clay in the Vale of Aylesbury, and there are many small streams. Much of the woods have been woodland has been coppiced. Wet areas have maple and ash. The ground flora is dominated by brambles and bluebells. Invertebrates include the rare black hairstreak butterfly and ground-hopper tetrix subulata.

There is access by footpaths from Calvert. Some areas have notices: "No public right of way: nature conservation area".

The former Great Central Main Line cuts through the southwestern edge of the wood. The alignment is still in use for freight. 1.4 hectares of woodland at the southwestern edge of the site will be lost with the construction of High Speed 2, which will pass adjacent to the existing railway.

References

Sites of Special Scientific Interest in Buckinghamshire
Forests and woodlands of Buckinghamshire